Julia Menéndez Ortega (born August 1, 1985 in Barcelona) is a field hockey defender from Spain. She represented her native country at the 2008 Summer Olympics in Beijing, PR China. She is affiliated with FC Junior Barcelona.

References

External links
 

1985 births
Living people
Spanish female field hockey players
Olympic field hockey players of Spain
Field hockey players at the 2008 Summer Olympics
Field hockey players from Barcelona